Jasionówka is a village in Mońki County, Podlaskie Voivodeship, in north-eastern Poland. It is the seat of the gmina (administrative district) called Gmina Jasionówka.

Jasionówka had 1,154 Jewish residents in 1897, and 1,306 in 1921. Nearly all of them were murdered by the Germans in World War II.

Today, the village has an approximate population of 860 people.

Notable residents
 Rabbi Gedaliah Silverstone

References
  פנקס הקהילות : אנציקלופדיה שח היישובים היהודיים למן היווסדם ועד לאחר שואת מלחמת העולם השנייה. פולין. כרך שמיני, מחוזות וילנה, ביאליסטוק, נובוגרודק // (Transliterated title: Pinkas ha-kehilot; entsiklopediya shel ha-yishuvim le-min hivasdam ve-ad le-aher shoat milhemet ha-olam ha-sheniya: Poland vol. 8: Vilna, Białystok, Nowogródek districts) // (English title: Pinkas hakehillot: encyclopedia of Jewish Communities: Poland vol. 8: Vilna, Białystok, Nowogródek districts) - edited by Shmuel Spector, published in Jerusalem, 2005.

Villages in Mońki County